Pedro Vásquez de Velasco  (1657–1714) was a Roman Catholic prelate who was Bishop of Santa Cruz de la Sierra (1706–1714).

Biography
Pedro Vásquez de Velasco was born in Lima, Peru. On February 22, 1706, he was selected by the King of Spain and confirmed by Pope Innocent XI as Bishop of Santa Cruz de la Sierra. In 1706, he was consecrated bishop by Melchor Liñán y Cisneros, Archbishop of Lima. He was Bishop of Santa Cruz de la Sierra until his death on February 26, 1714. While Bishop, he was the principal co-consecrator of Luis Francisco Romero, Bishop of Santiago de Chile.

References

External links and additional sources
 (for chronology of Bishops) 
 (for chronology of Bishops) 

1657 births
1714 deaths
People from Lima
Bishops appointed by Pope Innocent XI
Roman Catholic bishops of Santa Cruz de la Sierra